Friedrich Altmeyer (26 November 1928 – 13 November 2013) was a German footballer who played for SV Saar 05 Saarbrücken and the Saarland national team as a forward.

References

1928 births
2013 deaths
German footballers
Saar footballers
Saarland international footballers
SV Saar 05 Saarbrücken players
Association football forwards